Syodon is an extinct genus of dinocephalian therapsids that lived approximately 267-260 million years ago during the middle Permian period of the Paleozoic era. These therapsids, located in Russia  were initially believed to be true mammals.  Syodon was first named by Stephan Kutorga in 1838. The fossils of these synapsids were first discovered in the Molotov Province region of Russia in limestone beds with a high content of copper. However, scientists believe that these organisms likely come from higher rock beds due to increased specializations in their morphology.

Etymology 

The name Syodon is derived from Greek meaning pig's tooth. This name likely stemmed from the protruding canines similar to that of the lower canines of a wild boar.

Diet 

Syodon is characterized as a carnivore, likely feeding on small-bodied prey.  They lack the ‘expansion of supraorbital bones over the orbits, which would act as a stress sink’ in certain hypercarniverous species such as thalattosuchian Dakosaurus. This thickened supraorbital regions also found in large theropods would have alleviated cranial stress used for feeding on large prey. Since this adaption is not found in Syodon it is thought they were limited to small animals and prey which they could easily consume with their limited jaw architecture.

Paleobiology 

Syodon is characterized by possessing "bulbous" post-canines featuring significant wear facets in adults, whereas juveniles tend to have ‘bladelike’ post canines. The canine of Syodon is highly distinctive and allows it to be distinguished easily. They also possess a large, strongly curved ‘hook-like canine. Syodon also feature a set of smaller, replacement teeth out-of-place from the main palatine tooth row.

The snout of Syodon is relatively long narrow compared to the rest of the body. The snout comprises approximately 1/4 the length of the skill. These synapsids reached 1.2 m (4 ft) in length.

See also
 List of therapsids
 Archaeosyodon
 Microsyodon

References

Anteosaurs
Prehistoric therapsid genera
Extinct animals of Russia
Fossil taxa described in 1838